The legislative assembly election in the Indian union territory of Puducherry was held on 16 May 2016 to elect members of the 30 constituencies in the non-contiguous territory to constitute Fourteenth Puducherry Legislative Assembly.

Background 

By the requirement, the election must be held at an interval of five years or whenever it is dissolved by the President. The previous election was conducted on 13 April 2011 and its term would have naturally expired on 2 June 2016. The election was organised and conducted by the Election Commission of India (ECI).

The Dravida Munnetra Kazhagam and the Indian National Congress were in an alliance and contested 9 and 21 seats respectively. Ruling AINRC, BJP & ADMK will contest separately.

The polling booths in three Assembly constituencies in Puducherry (out of total 30 segments) were equipped with Voter-verified paper audit trail (VVPAT) machines along with EVMs.

Voting 
The election was held on 16 May 2016 in a single phase and 84.11% voting was recorded. The votes were counted on 19 May and results were declared on same day.

Result

!colspan=10|
|- valign="top"
!Colspan=2|Parties and Coalitions 
! Votes 
! Vote % 
! Vote swing
! Contested
! Won
! Change
|-
| style="background-color:"|
|Indian National Congress 
| 2,44,886
| 30.60
|  5.54
|21 
|15
|8 
|-
| style="background-color:"|
|All India N.R. Congress
| 2,25,082
| 28.1
|  3.65
| 30 
| 8
|7 
|-
| style="background-color:"|
|All India Anna Dravida Munnetra Kazhagam 
| 134,597
| 16.8
|  3.05
| 30
| 4
|1
|-
| style="background-color:"|
|Dravida Munnetra Kazhagam
| 70,836
| 8.9
|  1.78
| 9
| 2
|
|-
| style="background-color:"|
|Bharatiya Janata Party
| 19,303
| 2.4
|  1.08
| 30 
| 0
|
|-
| style="background-color:"|
|Independents
| 62,884
| 7.9
| –
| 
|1
| 
|-
| style="background-color:"|
|None of the above
| 13,240
| 1.7
| –
| –
| –
| –
|-
| colspan=2|Total
| 8,00,343
|
| 
|
| 30
|
|-
|-
! colspan="9" |
|-
| style="text-align:left;" colspan="2" |Valid votes
|8,00,343
|99.86
| colspan="4" rowspan="5" style="background-color:#E9E9E9"  |
|-
| style="text-align:left;" colspan="2" |Invalid votes
|1,099
|0.14
|-
| style="text-align:left;" colspan="2" |Votes cast / turnout
|8,01,442
|85.08
|-
| style="text-align:left;" colspan="2" |Abstentions
| 1,43,490
| 14.92
|-
| style="text-align:left;" colspan="2" |Registered voters
| 9,41,935
|colspan="1" style="background-color:#E9E9E9"|
|-
|align=left colspan=8|Source: International Business Times
|}

Results by constituency

See also 
 Elections in India
 2016 elections in India

References

External links
Election Commission of India

2016 State Assembly elections in India
2016
2010s in Puducherry